María Alejandra Marín Verhelst (born 4 November 1995) is a Colombian volleyball player. She is part of the Colombia women's national volleyball team.

Career
With Bolivar, she won the 2010 Colombian Youth National Championship and the 2010 Colombian Junior Championship. She claimed the fifth place in the 2010 Youth South American Championship held in Peru.

She won the silver medal in the 2011 Colombia Junior Championship, representing Bolivar and later she won with Bolivar the 2011 Inter Schools Championships.

2013
In the 2013 Copa Latina, she won with her national team the gold medal and the Best Setter award. In June she traveled to Brno, Czech Republic, to play the 2013 FIVB U20 World Championship, ending up in the 13th place. She finished the pool play round as the top setter; she recalled that she found very important spending four months practicing together and would like to have faced the tournament with even harder strength. She won the 2013 Colombian Championship in the senior category with Bolivar.
She won the 2013 Bolivarian Games bronze medal with her national team.

2014
Marín won with Bolivar the 2014 Colombian National Senior Championship played in Cali. In August 2014, Gómez won the silver medal in the 2014 U22 South American Championship.

She won the Best Setter award in the 2014 U23 Pan-American Cup.

2015
On club level she played for Liga Bolivarense in 2015. With Liga Bolivarense she claimed the 2015 National Games championship over the Antioquia team without losing a single set in the whole tournament. In the 2015 South American Championship, she won the bronze medal with her national team and was awarded tournament's Best Setter.

2016
Marín joined the French club ASPTT Mulhouse. She helped Bolivar to win the 2016 Colombian U21 National Championship. She won the 2016 U22 South American Championship silver medal and the Best Setter and Most Valuable Player awards.

She was awarded 2016 Volleyball player of the year by the Colombian Volleyball Federation and the Colombia Olympic Committee.

2017
With ASPTT Mulhouse, Marín won the 2016/17 French Championship. After returning from France, she won the 2017 Colombian Senior Championship as the captain of the Bolivar team, their fifth championship. She played with her national senior team the 2017 South American Championship, winning the silver medal when they lost 0-3 to Brazil, winning the Best Setter individual award. She played in October the 2018 FIVB  World Championship CSV qualification tournament, but her team could not get a berth for next year competition.

She won the bronze medal in the 2017 Bolivarian Games under 23 tournament. She won the 2017 Volleyball player of the year in December, 2017.

Personal life
She studied in the Institución Educativa Soledad Acosta de Samper (I.E.S.A.S.) high school and as of 2015 she was studying Business Administration in the Universidad Tecnológica de Bolívar.

Awards

Individuals
 2013 Copa Latina "Best Setter"
 2014 U23 Pan-American Cup "Best Setter"
 2015 South American Championship "Best Setter"
 2016 U22 South American Championship "Most Valuable Player"
 2016 U22 South American Championship "Best Setter"
 2017 South American Championship "Best Setter"
 2021 South American Championship "Best Setter"

Clubs
 2014 Colombian Championship –  Champion, with Liga Bolivarense
 2016-17 French Championship –  Champion, with ASPTT Mulhouse
 2017 Colombian Championship –  Champion, with Liga Bolivarense
 2018 Superliga B - Vice campeã

References

1995 births
Living people
Colombian women's volleyball players
Place of birth missing (living people)
Setters (volleyball)
Expatriate volleyball players in France
Expatriate volleyball players in Brazil
Colombian expatriate sportspeople in France
Colombian expatriate sportspeople in Brazil
Pan American Games medalists in volleyball
Pan American Games silver medalists for Colombia
Volleyball players at the 2019 Pan American Games
Medalists at the 2019 Pan American Games
20th-century Colombian women
21st-century Colombian women